Gonodonta nutrix, the citrus fruitpiercer, is a moth of the family Erebidae. The species was first described by Pieter Cramer in 1780 It is found from in Saint Lucia, Cuba, Jamaica, Florida and from Mexico to Paraguay.

The wingspan is 36–40 mm.

The larvae feed on Annona species, including A. glabra. The adults pierce soft fruits to feed on plant juices. The feeding wound often spoils and renders the fruit unsalable.

References

Calpinae
Moths described in 1780